Gremio Sol del Este, commonly known as Sol del Este, is a Paraguayan football club based in Ciudad del Este, Paraguay and plays in the Primera B Nacional. In 2018, the club was renamed Gremio Sol del Este.

History

The club was founded 26 January 2009 in Ciudad del Este.

The very first Primera División B Nacional championship was played in 2011 and Sol del Este was its first runner-up.

In 2012, the club was champion of the San Isidro de Curuguaty Cup disputed in Uruguay, as played on behalf of the Liga Deportiva Paranaense.

On 18 May 2015, it was reported that the director of the club, Rovilson Galeano, informed that Sol del Este would withdraw from the 2015 Primera División B Nacional season due to lack of financial resources. The club was scheduled to be one of four Alto Paraná clubs to dispute the competition along with Paranaense, Cerro Porteño PF and R.I. 3 Corrales.

Honors
National
Paraguayan Third Division 
Runner-up: 2011

International
Copa San Isidro de Curuguaty: 2012

References

External links
 PlayMaker Stats
 Facebook Profile

Football clubs in Paraguay
Ciudad del Este
Association football clubs established in 2009
2009 establishments in Paraguay